G.V. Florida Transport, Incorporated, previously known as Florida Liner is a Philippine bus company headquartered in Barangay Matucay Allacapan, Cagayan, and is one of the major bus companies in Northern Luzon. it was founded by Virgilio Florida, Sr. in 1970. The company was incorporated in 1999 and currently managed by brothers George Florida and Virgilio Florida, Jr., along with Harry Florida, the current municipal mayor of Allacapan, Cagayan.

The company also offers bus chartering services to individuals and corporations.

Etymology

The name of the bus company is derived from the incorporators of the company, the Florida brothers – George Florida and Virgilio Florida, Jr. – of which their initials of their first names were used as the name of the said company.

History

G.V. Florida Transport, Inc. was incorporated in 1999 by Virgilio Florida and his son, George Florida, from Barangay of Matucay, in the municipality of Allacapan, Cagayan That time, the now defunct EMC Transportation, Inc. was the largest bus company operating in Cagayan and Quirino provinces. The company operated formerly as Florida Liner, which was founded by Virgilio Florida, Sr. at the end of the 1970s. Even as a new player in the industry back then, GV Florida has attracted the riding public with its ultra-luxury buses, with the distinctive flowery livery, on a pink body color, their company color, adorning all sides of their buses. G.V. Florida Transport ferries goods and passengers from Metro Manila to Cagayan Valley Region and Ilocos Region. Also, it operates inter-provincial routes between neighboring provinces in Cagayan Valley.

G.V. Florida Transport started its Ilocos Route when they acquired F. Franco Transit and B. Trans. It expanded more with the acquisition of Autobus Transportation's Ilocos line. They also expanded its Cagayan Valley and Isabela route when they acquired Viva Alladin, Ballesteros Bus Line, and Dagupan Bus Company's franchises. With the acquisition of Autobus' remaining routes, GV Florida will commence its Baguio's route soon.
    
G.V. Florida Transport is noted for being the first Philippine bus company to introduce the "Sleeper class" (see below), with Golden Dragon, Higer & Hino RM sleeper buses currently servicing Manila-Tuguegarao, and Manila-Laoag-Tuguegarao routes

A sister bus company, GMW Florida Trans Inc., is being operated by the other siblings of George. This company serves the Santiago-Cauayan-Tuguegarao-Laoag, Tuguegarao-Baguio via San Jose, Nueva Ecija and Bayombong and Tuguegarao-Abra via Bantay/Vigan routes.

During the later part of 2011, GV Florida Transport expanded its fleet by purchasing initial fleet of 6 MAN R39 18.350 as part of its Super Deluxe fleet and 20 Exclusively modified PHI Grandeza RM as part of its deluxe fleet. They continued to purchase PHI Grandeza and they used this model to re-body some of their Korean buses. As of year 2013, they started purchasing DM14 Series (body assembled by Del Monte Motor Works, Inc.) with Hino RM chassis as their Deluxe and Super Deluxe fleet.

On the early morning of February 7, 2014, a GV Florida bus (plate number TXT-872) fell into a ravine in Sitio Pagang, Barangay Talubin in Bontoc. It was carrying 45 people. Fourteen were killed, including one Dutch and one Canadian national, and Filipino comedian & actor Tado Jimenez.

The Land Transportation Franchising Regulatory Board (LTFRB) imposed a 30-day preventive suspension on all of the company's 186 bus units on February 10, 2014, three days after the incident.

Recently, GV Florida Transport continues to expand its bus units such as Higer U-Tour Series, Hino RM with Grandecho II Series (body assemble by Pilipinas Hino Inc) & DM16 S1 Series (body assembled by Del Monte Motor Works, Inc.) as part of Deluxe fleet . As of today, they have acquired Hino RM with Kinglong XMQ6129Y Front & Rear fascia with Golden Dragon XML6127 "Marcopolo" side & combination of Hino Grandeza Series Foglamps (custom body made by GV Florida Bus Body) as part of irs Deluxe and new Sleeper Class fleets.

Fare class

G.V. Florida has employed various types of fare classes. These are:

Regular Air Conditioned Fare: Seats between 45–50 passengers.
Deluxe Class: Seats 41–45 passengers with Restroom (with Air Suspension)
Executive Deluxe Class: Seats 41 passengers with more leg room, Restroom, Air-suspension
Super Deluxe Class: 2x1 Spacious seats, 29 seater, 2 LCD, Restroom.(non-stop travel)
Sleeper Class: 35 Bunk bed's, 4 T.V.,Restroom for Manila-Tuguegarao travels.(non-stop travel)
Audio & Video systems are standard on all units.

The Operating Fleet

G.V. Florida Transport has grown to about 300 buses.

Del Monte Motor Works, Inc.
DM09 (Regular Fare and Deluxe)
 Mercedes-Benz OH-1625
DM11 Extensively  modified (Regular Fare and Deluxe) (in process of phasing out)
 Hyundai Aero Express HSX
 Hyundai Aero Space LS
 Daewoo BH116

Note : All of DM09 & DM11 Series Body is out of service
DM14 Series I (Regular, Executive Deluxe, Super Deluxe & Sleeper Class)
 Hino RM2PSS
GD XML6127 Marcopolo replica (Regular Fare, Executive Deluxe and Super Deluxe)
 Hino RF821 (out of service)
 Hino RM2PSS
 Hino RU2PSS (in KTP Chassis)
 Hyundai Aero Express HSX
 MAN R39 18.350 HOCL
 Mercedes-Benz OH1625
 Nissan Diesel RB46S (out of service)
 Hyundai Aero Space LS
 Daewoo BH116
 Kia Granbird (SD-I Greenfield, SD-II Parkway, & HD Sunshine)
DM16 Series I (Executive Deluxe)
 Hino RM2PSS
 Hino RN8JSUJ
Zhongtong LCK6123RA
Hino Motors Philippines
 Hino MR Series (Deluxe) (rebodied to DM14 Series 1 Body)
 Hino RM2PSS
Hino Grandeza – It is exclusively and extensively modified so it will resemble like GD XML6127 Marcopolo. (Regular Fare and Executive Deluxe)
 Hino RM2PSS
 Hyundai Aero Space LS
 Daewoo BH115
 Daewoo BH116
 SsangYong Transtar 
 Kia Granbird (SD-I Greenfield, SD-II Parkway, & HD Sunshine)
Hino Grandecho II – It is exclusively and extensively modified so it will resemble like GD XML6127 Marcopolo. (Executive Deluxe)
 Hino RM2PSS
Hino Grandeza 2  
 Hino RN8JSUJ
King Long
 XMQ6127 J3 "Euro Star" (Deluxe) Face Lifted as GD XML6127 (Out of service)
Higer
V92W KLQ6129QWE3 (Sleeper bus) (Face lifted as Kinglong XMQ6129Y)
KLQ6123KQ U-Tour (Deluxe) 
KLQ6118H U-Tour (Regular Fare for GMW Trans)
KLQ6128LQ U-Tour (Russian Variant)
Golden Dragon (company)
XML6127 "Marco Polo" (Deluxe & Sleeper)
Zhongtong Bus
LCK6118H Elegance (Regular Fare unit for GMW Trans)
LCK6123RA (Deluxe Fare in DM16 Series 1 Body GVF Made)

Note: Some of their Korean-made units (F-Series) have been either rebodied, in processing to demoted into GMW Trans or sold to other bus companies.

Terminals

GV Florida
Cagayan Valley
Cagayan
Abulug (Jct.Luna)
Alcala
Aparri
Baggao
Ballesteros
Buguey
Claveria
Enrile
Gatarran (Brgy Nabaccayan)
Gonzaga
Lasam
Piat
Tuao
Tuguegarao City
Sanchez-Mira
Santa Ana
Isabela
Aurora
Burgos
Cabatuan
Delfin Albano
Echague
Ilagan City
Jones
Luna
Roxas
San Agustin
San Mateo
Santiago City
Tumauini
Quirino
Maddela
Ilocos Region
Ilocos Norte
Batac
Dingras
Laoag City
Nueva Era
Pagudpud
Piddig
Solsona

GMW Trans

Inter-Provincial Routes (vice versa)
Cagayan Valley
Isabela
Delfin Albano
Roxas
Santiago City
Cordillera Administrative Region
Abra
Bangued
Benguet
Baguio
Ilocos Region
Ilocos Norte
Laoag City
Ilocos Sur
Bantay (which is just outside Vigan)

Destinations

Metro Manila
Sampaloc, Manila
Kamias, Quezon City (near Kamuning Road)

Provincial Destinations

Tuguegarao, Cagayan (via Dau/TPLEX with also selected trips via Ilagan City & Cauayan or via Mallig & Roxas)
Aparri, Cagayan 
Gonzaga, Cagayan 
Junction Luna Abulug, Cagayan (via Laoag City)
Ballesteros, Cagayan (via Ilagan City &  Cauayan or Mallig/Roxas or via Laoag/Jct.Luna)
Buguey, Cagayan 
Santa Ana, Cagayan 
Lasam, Cagayan 
Allacapan, Cagayan 
 Nabaccayan, Gattaran, Cagayan 
Baggao, Cagayan
Piat, Cagayan
Solana, Cagayan 
Enrile, Cagayan 
Sanchez-Mira, Cagayan (Via Laoag) 
Pamplona, Cagayan (Via Laoag)
Claveria, Cagayan (Via Laoag)
Santa Praxedes, Cagayan (Via Laoag)
Kabugao, Apayao
Solano, Nueva Vizcaya
Maddela, Quirino (via Cordon, Isabela)
Santiago City, Isabela
Echague, Isabela 
San Agustin, Isabela (via Jones)
Angadanan, Isabela (re-opened route via Alicia)
Ilagan City, Isabela 
Cauayan, Isabela 
San Mateo, Isabela 
Aurora, Isabela 
Burgos, Isabela 
Quirino, Isabela 
Cabatuan, Isabela 
Luna, Isabela 
Roxas, Isabela 
Delfin Albano, Isabela (via Mallig)
Laoag, Ilocos Norte (via Dau/Tarlac or TPLEX)
Batac, Ilocos Norte
Dingras, Ilocos Norte 
Pagudpud, Ilocos Norte 
Bacarra, Ilocos Norte 
Solsona, Ilocos Norte 
Nueva Era, Ilocos Norte 
Banna, Ilocos Norte 
Paoay, Ilocos Norte 
Pasuquin, Ilocos Norte
Pura, Tarlac (first Meal Stop near TPLEX Pura Exit) 
Mabalacat, Pampanga (Dau Bus Terminal)
Guimba, Nueva Ecija (bound to all Cagayan Valley trips only via TPLEX Pura Exit)

Passengers may board and leave the bus at any point.

GMW Trans Destinations

Cauayan, Isabela 
Ilagan City, Isabela
Santiago, Isabela 
Delfin Albano, Isabela 
Laoag, Ilocos Norte 
Tuguegarao, Cagayan 
Santa Ana, Cagayan
Vigan, Ilocos Sur 
Bangued, Abra 
Pudtol, Apayao
Baguio, Benguet (via Laoag)

Former Destinations
Bontoc, Mountain Province (via Banaue, Ifugao, Solano & Bagabag, Nueva Vizcaya)
Banaue, Ifugao (via Solano & Bagabag, Nueva Vizcaya) 
Tabuk, Kalinga

Fleet Numbering

G.V. Florida Transport has its own special numberings on every kind of their units.

F-Series – Regular Fare & 2 unit Deluxe. Korean-made units. (with restrooms).
GD-Series – Golden Dragon XML6127 Marcopolo, DM14 & DM16 Series and GD Marcopolo Replica from Del Monte Motor Works, Inc and Grandeza from Pilipinas Hino (Regular Fare, Deluxe and Super Deluxe).
S and H Series – Composed of Higer, Hino, and Golden Dragon Sleeper Buses.
KL Series (KL1 and KL2 only) – Composed of their 2 Kinglong Units (Demoted to Deluxe)
J Series – Kia Granbird exclusive fleet numbering (Regular Fare) 
001-999 – Regular and Deluxe Fare original series (with restroom)

See also
 Dagupan Bus Co, Inc.
 Five Star Bus Company
 List of bus companies of the Philippines

References

 https://www.flickr.com/groups/floridatransport/
 https://newsinfo.inquirer.net/867865/driver-dead-27-hurt-in-nueva-vizcaya-bus-crash
 https://www.rappler.com/nation/160391-nueva-vizcaya-bus-crash

Bus companies of the Philippines
Transport companies established in 1971
1971 establishments in the Philippines
Cagayan